The 3rd Siberian Rifle Division was an infantry formation of the Russian Imperial Army that fought in World War I. During the Russo-Japanese War, it was officially called the 3rd East Siberian Rifle Division (3-я (Восточно-)Сибирская стрелковая дивизия).

Order of battle 
The organization of the division in 1914 was as follows.
1st Brigade (HQ Vladivostok)
9th Siberian Rifle Regiment
10th Siberian Rifle Regiment
2nd Brigade (HQ Vladivostok)
11th Siberian Rifle Regiment 
12th Siberian Rifle Regiment
3rd Siberian Rifle Artillery Brigade

References 

Infantry divisions of the Russian Empire
Military units and formations disestablished in 1918